USS Gloucester has been the name of two ships in the United States Navy.

 , a gunboat built in 1891 that served during the Spanish–American War
 , a  launched in 1943

United States Navy ship names